Djountou  (or Diountou) is a town and sub-prefecture in the Lélouma Prefecture in the Labé Region of northern-central Guinea.

References

Populated places in the Labé Region
Sub-prefectures of Guinea